Khasheh (also Romanized as Khasheh; also known as Khasheh-ye Salmān Sardār and Salmān Sardār) is a village in Seyyed Abbas Rural District, Shavur District, Shush County, Khuzestan Province, Iran. At the 2006 census, its population was 467, in 89 families.

References 

Populated places in Shush County